"The Mock Turtle's Song", also known as the "Lobster Quadrille", is a song recited by the Mock Turtle in Lewis Carroll's 1865 novel Alice's Adventures in Wonderland, accompanied by a dance. It was taught to him at school by his teacher called Tortoise.

Context 

"The Lobster Quadrille" is a song written by Charles Lutwidge Dodgson (Lewis Carroll). It is a parody of "The Spider and the Fly" by Mary Botham Howitt. It appeared in Chapter 10 of Carroll's book Alice's Adventures in Wonderland, and was sung by a character in the book, the Mock Turtle.

The poem is very similar to "The Spider and the Fly" in its rhyme scheme, meter, and tone. The first lines of the two songs are as follows:

Will you walk a little faster said a whiting to a snail... (The Lobster Quadrille)

Will you walk into my parlour said a spider to a fly... (The Spider and the Fly)

The song fits into the flow of chapters 9 and 10, "The Mock Turtle's Story" and "The Lobster Quadrille", which are about the Mock Turtle's life and schooling under the sea. The whimsical lyrics feature animals such as porpoises, snails and lobsters. The snail is invited to join a dance in which he would be cast into the English Channel towards France, but he fearfully declines. The reason is left unspoken in the song, but France is known for its consumption of escargot.

Lyrics

Settings 
The song was performed by Franz Ferdinand (band) for the 2010 film Alice in Wonderland. The song was featured in the film's soundtrack.

The song was performed by the band The Four Postmen on their 1997 album Looking for Grandpa in an upbeat modern style.

The song was performed by the punk rock band Feederz on their 1986 album Teachers in Space.

The song was performed by Donald Fagen and Walter Becker (with Becker doing the lead vocals) as part of a number of demo songs recorded before they formed the band Steely Dan.

The song was set for chorus by Irving Fine in his "Three Choruses from Alice in Wonderland" (1942).

The poem was set to music by György Ligeti in his "Nonsense Madrigals" (1988/93).

The song is sung by a chorus to the "real" Alice in the 1985 film Dreamchild.

The song was included on The Simon Sisters' children's album, The Simon Sisters Sing the Lobster Quadrille and Other Songs for Children (1969).

See also 
 Mock Turtle
 Lewis Carroll
 Alice's Adventures in Wonderland
 Mary Botham Howitt
 The Spider and the Fly (poem)

References 

 Alice's Adventures in Wonderland, chapters 9 and 10, by Lewis Carroll,
 http://www.online-literature.com/carroll/901/

Songs about reptiles
Songs about fictional characters
Alice's Adventures in Wonderland
Poetry by Lewis Carroll
1865 songs